Rip Kirby is an American comic strip created by Alex Raymond and Ward Greene featuring the adventures of private detective Rip Kirby. The strip ran from 1946 to 1999 and was in the hands of artist John Prentice for more than 40 years.

Publication history 
After World War II, Raymond did not return to work on any of his previous successful comic strips (Flash Gordon, Jungle Jim, Secret Agent X-9), but instead began work on a new strip in which ex-Marine Rip Kirby returns from World War II and goes to work as a private detective, sometimes accompanied by his girlfriend, fashion model Judith Lynne "Honey" Dorian. (Her given name and nickname were borrowed from the names of Raymond's three daughters.)

Rip Kirby was based on the suggestion by King Features editor Ward Greene that Raymond try a "detective-type" strip. First published on March 4, 1946, the strip was given significant promotion by the syndicate, even including fully painted promotional art, a rarity in comic-strip promotions. The strip enjoyed success, and Raymond received the Reuben Award in 1949.

During Raymond's years on the strip, the stories were initially written by Ward Greene, and later, following Greene's death, by Fred Dickenson. Some sequences were also written by Raymond. In 1956, Raymond was killed in a car crash. King Features quickly needed a replacement, and found it in John Prentice. Dickenson continued to write the series until the mid-1980s, when he was forced to retire for health reasons. Prentice then took over the writing along with others. Prentice kept the strip going until his own death in 1999. The strip ended with Rip's retirement on June 26, 1999. Prentice received the National Cartoonists Society Story Comic Strip Award for 1966, 1967, and 1986 for his work on the strip.

Over the years of publication, the strip was ghosted and assisted by many artists and writers, including Frank Bolle (who completed the last episode), Al Williamson, and Gray Morrow.

Characters and story
Comics historian Don Markstein notes how the character of Remington "Rip" Kirby broke away from the usual pulp detective archetype:

Writers and artists

Reception
Writer Mike W. Barr described Rip Kirby as a "great syndicated detective strip." He added "Raymond's artistry gave the world populated by Kirby & co. a lushness and fluidity that the comics pages had never seen".

Reprints
In 1948, Rip Kirby strips were reprinted in issues #51 and #54 of David McKay Publications's Feature Book. Issue #51 included a biography of Alex Raymond with a photograph showing him sketching an unnamed model for Honey Dorian. In 1980, Pacific Comics Club reprinted the 1946-1950 strips in 16 comic books. In 1988, Pioneer published 6 books and 2 more collections the following year.

Internationally Published Reprints 
Some of the Rip Kirby comic strips were reprinted in India as comic books in the popular comic book series called Indrajal Comics.

The strip was published in a dozen comic book magazines in former Yugoslavia. In 1983 Radio Television of Serbia produced an educational series about comics, which included live action sequences featuring Nebojsa Krstic as Rip Kirby and Predrag Milinkovic as his butler. Milinkovic looked the part insomuch that he was nicknamed Desmond. From 2011 to 2019 Croatian publisher Fibra reprinted the complete 1946-1999 strip in 19 volumes.

IDW Publishing
In 2009, IDW Publishing started to reprint the Rip Kirby strip as part of its The Library of American Comics. The first four volumes contain a complete reprint of Raymond's stories including the last one, finished by Prentice. Volume 5 continues with Prentice's work.

Story list

References

External links
 Thrilling Detective: Rip Kirby
 Tribute: John Prentice

1946 comics debuts
1999 comics endings
Kirby, Rip
American comic strips
Kirby, Rip
Crime comics
Kirby, Rip
Detective comic strips
Kirby, Rip